Year 1309 (MCCCIX) was a common year starting on Wednesday (link will display the full calendar) of the Julian calendar.

Events 
 By place 

 Europe 
 March 14 – Sultan Muhammad III is deposed during a palace coup after a 7-year reign, and is replaced by his half-brother Abu al-Juyush Nasr, as ruler of the Emirate of Granada. Muhammad III is spared and allowed to live in Almuñécar, but his vizier, Abu Abdallah ibn al-Hakim, is killed. 
 April
 After his ascent to the throne, Nasr sends envoys to the Marinid court at Fez, Morocco .
 Kings James II (the Just) and his ally Ferdinand IV (the Summoned) ask Pope Clement V, without mentioning their collaboration with the Marinids, to grant a crusading bull and financial support from the church. In response, Aragon and Castile plan to blockade the Strait of Gibraltar with their fleets (some 40 galleys), and to expel the Saracen forces from Spain.
 May 12 – Sultan Abu al-Rabi Sulayman launches an attack on Ceuta. He concludes an alliance with James II (the Just), and concedes commercial benefits to Castilian merchants. Abu al-Rabi also sends 1,000 measures of wheat to Aragon. A few months later, Marinid forces, without Castilian support, occupy Ceuta on July 20. Expelling Saracen forces from Morocco. 
 July – Siege of Algeciras: Castilian forces led by Ferdinand IV (the Summoned) begin the siege of Algeciras. King Denis I (the Poet King) sends a contingent of 700 knights to support the siege. He provides Ferdinand, in accordance with his friendship, a loan of 16,600 silver marks. 
 August 11 – Siege of Almería: Aragonese forces (some 12,000 men) under James II (the Just) land on the coast of Almería and begin blockading the city with his fleet. His forces include siege engines such as mangonels and trebuchets. James orders multiple unsuccessful assaults on the city and is forced (due to a shortage of supplies) to make a truce in December.Joseph F. Callaghan (2011). The Gibraltar Crusade: Castile and the Battle for the Strait, pp. 131–132. University of Pennsylvania Press.  .
 August 15 – Conquest of Rhodes: The Byzantine garrison of the city of Rhodes surrenders to the Crusader forces of the Knights Hospitaller under Grand Master Foulques de Villaret – completing their conquest of Rhodes. The knights establish their headquarters on the island and rename themselves as the Knights of Rhodes.
 September 12 – Siege of Gibraltar: Castilian forces under Juan Núñez II de Lara and Alonso Pérez de Guzmán besiege and conquer the Saracen fortress at Gibraltar – which is held for nearly 600 years (see 711). During the siege, the port is blockaded. Ferdinand IV (the Summoned) orders to repair the damaged city walls.
 October – About 500 knights led by John of Castile desert the Castilian encampment.
 England 
 October – King Edward II summons a council to meet at York, but several nobles refuse to attend due to Piers Gaveston's attendance. Since he returned from exile, Gaveston tries to alienate the nobles from the king. 
 Alnwick Castle in Northumberland is bought by the House of Percy, later Earls of Northumberland. 

 By topic 

 Cities and Towns 
 The village of Lukáčovce in Slovakia first appears in the historical records.

 Religion 
 March 9 – Pope Clement V chooses the city of Avignon, part of the Kingdom of Arles, as his residence (known as the Avignon Papacy). The papal seat becomes part of the Holy Roman Empire – rather than in Rome. This absence from Rome is referred to as the "Babylonian captivity of the Papacy".

Births 
 March 25 – Robert de Ferrers, English nobleman and knight (d. 1350)
 June 9 – Rupert I, German nobleman and count palatine (d. 1390) 
 December 6 – Humphrey de Bohun, English nobleman (d. 1361)
probable – Aldona of Lithuania (or Anna), queen consort of Poland (d. 1339)
 Conrad of Megenberg, German scholar and scientist (d. 1374)

Deaths 
 January 4 – Angela of Foligno, Italian nun, mystic and writer (b. 1248) 
 February 9 – Nanpo Shōmyō, Japanese monk and priest (b. 1235)
 March 7 – Lovato Lovati, Italian scholar, judge and writer (b. 1241)
 March 14 – Abu Abdallah ibn al-Hakim, Andalusian vizier (b. 1261)
 April 10 (probable) – Elisabeth von Rapperswil, Swiss noblewoman (b. 1251)
 May 5 – Charles II (the Lame), son of Charles I of Anjou (b. 1254)
 May 19 – Agostino Novello, Italian priest and prior general (b. 1240)
 July 13 – John I, Dutch nobleman and bishop (House of Nassau)
 July 16 – James Stewart, Scottish nobleman and knight (b. 1260)
 August 10 – Giovanni Boccamazza, Italian cardinal and archbishop
 September 19 – Alonso Pérez de Guzmán, Spanish nobleman (b. 1256)
 October 6 – Frederick VII, German nobleman (House of Hohenzollern)
 October 18 – Tettsū Gikai, Japanese monk and Zen Master (b. 1219)

References